Public Works Management and Policy is a peer-reviewed academic journal that publishes papers four times a year in the field of Public Administration. The journal's editor is Richard G. Little (University of Southern California). It has been in publication since 1996 and is currently published by SAGE Publications in association with the Section on Transportation Policy and Administration of the Administration of the American Society for Public Administration.

Scope 
Public Works Management and Policy is a resource for academics and practitioners in public works and the public and private infrastructure industries. The journal publishes research results, evaluative management innovations, methods of analysis and evaluation and policy issues. Public Works Management and Policy aims to address the planning, financing, development and operations of civil infrastructure systems.

Abstracting and indexing 
Public Works Management and Policy is abstracted and indexed in the following databases:
 Business Source Complete
 Business Source Elite
 Business Source Premier

External links 
 

SAGE Publishing academic journals
English-language journals
Public administration